RMR (pronounced "rumor") is an American rapper and singer. He first attained notoriety when his song "Rascal" went viral on YouTube in February 2020.

RMR was signed to Warner Records and Cmnty Rcrds from 2020 to 2022. After his release from Warner, he started his own label, RMRHasIt, a division of AWAL Recordings America.

Career
In February 2020, he independently released the song "Rascal", which quickly went viral on YouTube overnight, due to the video's content and portrayal. He signed to Warner Records and Cmnty Rcrds in April 2020. He dropped the single "Dealer", debuting its remix days later. The remix features American rappers Future and Lil Baby.

On June 12, 2020, he released his debut extended play, Drug Dealing is a Lost Art. The eight-track EP contains features from American rappers Future, Lil Baby, Westside Gunn and Young Thug.

On November 12, he released "The Wishing Hour", a reworking of the Matchbox Twenty song "3AM." It was subsequently announced RMR's next project would be called 4th Qtr Medley, a three-part series of re-imagined songs and interconnected videos similar to "Rascal," set to be released on November 24. On November 24, 4th Qtr Medley was released and featured reworkings of songs from Matchbox Twenty, Drake, and The Goo Goo Dolls. As of 2021, the music video for 4th Qtr Medley is no longer on YouTube, having been removed from RMR's channel, although the three individual songs are still accessible online.

On January 8, 2021, RMR released "Her Honeymoon". The accompanying music video featured three possible endings to the narrative, concluding with RMR encouraging fans to call or text his personal cell-phone to vote for their preferred ending.

On May 21, 2021, RMR released "Vibes" featuring Tyla Yaweh. The song was set to be the second single from RMR's upcoming debut album Hotel, but that album never materialized. On June 11, 2021, Billy Strings and RMR collaborated on a song called "Wargasm."

After a nearly two-year hiatus, RMR released "Crazy" with Ryan Lewis on March 3, 2023. It was his first official single release since "Vibes".

Personal life 
RMR was born in Ghana, Africa in 1996. He then later moved and grew up in Minneapolis, Minnesota when he was 4. He likes to keep his life private and remains professionally anonymous. As of 2020, RMR was living in Los Angeles, California, having been relocated from Minnesota.

RMR was a panel member on A View From The Front Line, an introspective panel discussion hosted by one of his labels Warner Records. Moderated by Gail Mitchell, Executive Director of R&B/Hip-Hop for Billboard, the panel included artists involved in the George Floyd protests and Paul Henderson, Director of Police Accountability for the City of San Francisco.

Artistry
RMR has received comparisons to Lil Nas X for his musical style, fusing elements of hip hop and country music. In addition to Rascal Flatts, he cites Kanye West, Drake, Lil Wayne and Michael Jackson as influences on his music.

Discography

Extended plays

References

1996 births
Living people
African-American country musicians
African-American male rappers
Country pop musicians
Country rap musicians
Masked musicians
Warner Records artists
21st-century African-American people